Moshe Arens (27 December 1925 – 7 January 2019) was an Israeli aeronautical engineer, researcher, diplomat and Likud politician. A member of the Knesset between 1973 and 1992 and again from 1999 until 2003, he served as Minister of Defense three times and once as Minister of Foreign Affairs. Arens also served as the Israeli ambassador to the U.S. and was a professor at the Technion in Haifa.

Early life and education
Arens was born in Kaunas, Lithuania, to a Jewish family. His father was an industrialist and his mother was a dentist. When he was a year old, his family moved to Riga, Latvia. where he attended elementary school. In 1939, Arens and his family emigrated to the United States, where his father had business interests. The family settled in New York City, where Arens attended George Washington High School.

As a youth, Arens was a leader in the Betar youth movement. During World War II, Arens served in the United States Army Corps of Engineers as a technical sergeant. Following the Israeli Declaration of Independence in 1948, Arens immigrated to the new State of Israel and joined the Irgun, despite the opposition of his father. He was sent to North Africa (mostly Morocco and Algeria) and Europe to help local Jewish communities establish self-defense groups. In March 1949, he returned to Israel, and became a founding member of the Herut party, which had grown out of the Irgun. He worked as an engineer for an American company that designed water systems for Tel Aviv.

In 1951, he returned to the United States, and studied engineering at the Massachusetts Institute of Technology and aeronautical engineering at the California Institute of Technology where he was a student of Qian Xuesen, then worked for a time in the aircraft industry.

Academic and research career
In 1957, Arens became professor of aeronautics at the Technion, serving in this position until 1962. After retiring from the government, he devoted himself to researching and commemorating the story of the Jewish Military Union (ŻZW), which fought alongside the better known Jewish Combat Organization (ŻOB) in the Warsaw Ghetto Uprising.  Arens is the author of a number of articles on the revolt as well as a book, Flags over the Warsaw Ghetto, which has been published in Hebrew, Polish and English.

Arens was chairman of the International Board of Governors of  Ariel University Center of Samaria. He was also a columnist for Haaretz newspaper.

Business career
From 1962 until 1971, Arens served as Deputy Director General at Israel Aircraft Industries, where he oversaw major development projects, including the Kfir fighter jet project.

Political career 
After the Yom Kippur War, Arens entered politics and was elected to the Knesset as a member of Likud in the 1973 elections. After being re-elected in 1977, he became chairman of the Foreign Affairs and Defense Committee. He voted against the Camp David Accords and the Egypt–Israel peace treaty. In 1980, Prime Minister Menachem Begin offered Arens the post of Minister of Defense, but he turned it down due to his disagreement over the terms of the Egypt–Israel Peace Treaty. Arens did not oppose peace with Egypt, but was opposed to certain aspects of the treaty, and thus did not want to have to oversee Israel's evacuation from the Sinai.

He was re-elected again in 1981, but resigned from the Knesset on 19 January 1982 when appointed ambassador to the United States. At this point, he brought his young protégé, Benjamin Netanyahu, then 32, to work for him in Washington. He returned to Israel in February 1983 after being appointed Minister of Defense, replacing Ariel Sharon, who had been forced out of office following the Kahan Commission's report on the Sabra and Shatila massacre. He was re-elected in 1984, but was only appointed Minister without Portfolio. After another re-election in 1988 he was appointed Minister of Foreign Affairs (with Netanyahu his deputy), and in 1990 returned to the Defense portfolio. He was Defence Minister when Hizbullah leader Sheikh Abbas al-Musawi was assassinated, 16 February 1992; al-Musawi's wife, son and four others were killed in the air strike.

After Likud lost the 1992 elections, Arens retired from politics. He returned in 1999, however, to challenge Netanyahu for the Likud leadership. Although he won  only 18% of the vote, Netanyahu appointed him Minister of Defense, replacing Yitzhak Mordechai, who had left Likud to establish the Centre Party. Although Arens returned to the Knesset after the 1999 elections, Likud lost the elections and he left the cabinet. He lost his seat for the final time in 2003.

Arens questioned the wisdom of Lockheed Martin F-35 Lightning II Israeli procurement, given the neglected state of Israeli ground forces. In an article for Fathom Journal, Arens stated that he was a critic of unilateral withdrawal from the West Bank and Gaza, accusing its proponents of suffering from "unilateral withdrawal syndrome".

Personal life
While living in the United States, Arens married Muriel F. Eisenberg from New York City, and she moved to Israel with him. The couple had four children, two boys and two girls; Yigal, Aliza, Raanan, and Ruth. Arens died on 7 January 2019 at the age of 93.

Published works
Optimum staging of cruising aircraft. Haifa: Technion - Israel Institute of Technology, Department of Aeronautical Engineering, 1959.
Some requirements for the efficient attainment of range by air-borne vehicles. Haifa: Technion - Israel Institute of Technology, Department of Aeronautical Engineering, 1959.
A hypersonic ramjet using a normal detonation wave.  Jerusalem: Weizmann Science Press of Israel, 1960.
Moshe Arens, Statesman and Scientist Speaks Out. (With Merill Simon) New York: Dean Books, 1988.
Broken covenant: American foreign policy and the crisis between the U.S. and Israel. New York: Simon & Schuster, 1995.
Flags Over the Warsaw Ghetto: The Untold Story of the Warsaw Ghetto Uprising. Jerusalem: Gefen, 2011.
In Defense of Israel: A Memoir of a Political Life. Washington DC: Brookings, 2018.

Awards and recognition
In 1971, Arens won the Israel Defense Prize. In 2016, Nefesh B'Nefesh awarded him the Bonei Zion Prize.

References

Further reading
Moshe Arens, statesman and scientist, speaks out, Merrill Simon,with a foreword by Daniel K. Inouye ; edited by Judith Featherman. Middle Island, N.Y.: Dean Books, 1988.

External links

Charlie Rose – Moshe Arens
Moshe Arens Israel Ministry of Foreign Affairs

1925 births
2019 deaths
George Washington Educational Campus alumni
Lithuanian Jews
Diplomats from Kaunas
Zionists
Lithuanian emigrants to the United States
Jewish American scientists
MIT School of Engineering alumni
California Institute of Technology alumni
American emigrants to Israel
American people of Lithuanian-Jewish descent
United States Army personnel of World War II
Betar members
Irgun members
Israeli Jews
Israeli educators
Ariel University
Academic staff of Technion – Israel Institute of Technology
Israel Defense Prize recipients
Ambassadors of Israel to the United States
Likud politicians
Ministers of Defense of Israel
Ministers of Foreign Affairs of Israel
Members of the 8th Knesset (1974–1977)
Members of the 9th Knesset (1977–1981)
Members of the 10th Knesset (1981–1984)
Members of the 11th Knesset (1984–1988)
Members of the 12th Knesset (1988–1992)
Members of the 15th Knesset (1999–2003)
Bonei Zion Prize recipients
United States Army Corps of Engineers personnel
Moskowitz Prize for Zionism laureates
Israeli writers
Engineers from Kaunas
United States Army soldiers
21st-century American Jews